Chitalmari Union is an Union parishad of Chitalmari Upazila, Bagerhat District in Khulna Division of Bangladesh. It has an area of 52.60 km2 (20.31 sq mi) and a population of 36,448.

References

Unions of Chitalmari Upazila
Unions of Bagerhat District
Unions of Khulna Division